The Troops of St. Tropez (literally The Policeman from Saint-Tropez) is a 1964 French comedy film set in Saint-Tropez, a fashionable resort on the French Riviera. Starring Louis de Funès as Ludovic Cruchot of the gendarmerie, the film is the first in the Gendarme series, and spawned five sequels.

Plot

Ludovic Cruchot (played by Louis de Funès), a highly uptight gendarme in a small French village, has been reassigned to the seaside commune of Saint-Tropez under the orders of Command Sergeant Major Gerber (played by Michel Galabru), who takes no lip from his outspoken new subordinate. His daughter Nicole quickly adapts to the life in the city and, much to Cruchot's traditional-minded chagrin, begins to mix with the local carefree youths who often blatantly defy her father's official authority. However, they ridicule her at first, so she states her father is a rich American named Ferguson who has arrived to the port with his yacht. He also owns a red Mustang.

Soon, the gendarmes find themselves confronted with a major problem: a group of persistent nudists. Any attempts to arrest them in flagrante delicto are foiled by a lookout; but after several failures, Cruchot manages to hatch a master plan and succeeds in getting all the nude swimmers arrested.

Later, Cruchot discovers that his daughter and her new boyfriend have stolen and crashed Ferguson's Mustang into a ditch, puncturing a tyre in the process. Unbeknownst to any of them, Ferguson and his teammates are a gang of robbers who have stolen a Rembrandt painting, which is still in the trunk. Cruchot manages to get the car out, but realizes that the objects he threw out of the car to fix a puncture, including the painting, are valuable items.

The man who pretends to own the painting then kidnaps Cruchot, but Nicole and her friends knock out the group that kidnapped her father, and the painting is returned to its rightful owner.

Cast 
 Louis de Funès: Ludovic Cruchot
 Geneviève Grad: Nicole Cruchot, daughter of Ludovic
 Michel Galabru: warrant officer Jérôme Gerber
 Jean Lefebvre: gendarme Lucien Fougasse
 Christian Marin: gendarme Albert Merlot
 Guy Grosso: gendarme Gaston Tricard
 Michel Modo: gendarme Jules Berlicot
Daniel Cauchy: one of the youths St-Tropez

Reception
The film was the most popular movie at the French box office in 1964.

References

External links 
 

1964 films
Italian comedy films
Films shot in Saint-Tropez
French comedy films
1960s French-language films
Films directed by Jean Girault
Films set in Saint-Tropez
Articles containing video clips
1960s police comedy films
Films partially in color
1964 comedy films
1960s French films
1960s Italian films